{{DISPLAYTITLE:Zeta1 Antliae}}

Zeta1 Antliae is the Bayer designation for a binary star system in the southern constellation of Antlia. They have apparent magnitudes of +6.20 and +7.01 and are separated by 8.042 arcseconds. The apparent magnitude of the combined system is +5.76, which is bright enough to be seen with the naked eye in suitably dark skies.

The two system components A and B are both A-type main sequence stars, hotter, larger, and more luminous than the Sun. The primary is spinning rapidly and the secondary relatively slowly.

References

Binary stars
Antliae, Zeta1
Antlia
A-type main-sequence stars
Durchmusterung objects
082383
046657
3780/1